French River/Alban Aerodrome  is an aerodrome located  southeast of Alban, Ontario near the French River in Canada.

References

Registered aerodromes in Ontario
Transport in Sudbury District